Eucalyptus ornans, commonly known as Avon peppermint, is a species of mallee that is endemic to a restricted area in Victoria. It has smooth whitish to grey bark, slightly glossy, bluish green, lance-shaped adult leaves, flower buds in groups of between seventeen and twenty one, white flowers and shortened hemispherical fruit.

Description
The crown of the plant often contains intermediate leaves as well as adult leaves. Flowering occurs in summer and the flowers are white.

Taxonomy and naming
Eucalyptus ornans was first formally described in 2011 by Kevin Rule and William Molyneux in the journal Muelleria but the description was not valid because no holotype was designated. A subsequent edition of the same journal corrected the typification. The specific epithet (ornans) is from the Latin word "ornatus", referring to the ornamental habit of this eucalypt.

Distribution
Avon peppermint is only known from a single population growing in coarse gravel near the Avon River, near Maffra.

Conservation status
This species is listed as "endangered" on the Victorian Government's Department of Sustainability and Environment's Advisory List of Rare Or Threatened Plants In Victoria and as "critically endangered" by the International  Union for Conservation of Nature Red List, noting that only ten mature individuals remain. The main threats to the species are climate change and severe weather events.

See also
List of Eucalyptus species

References

Flora of Victoria (Australia)
ornans
Myrtales of Australia
Plants described in 2011